Graham Robert McKenzie-Smith,  is an Australian historian and forester.

Military historian
McKenzie-Smith has written books about Australian Second World War army units and movements. He has been a regular contributor to Sabretache, the journal of the Military Historical Society of Australia.

McKenzie Smith spent some 35 years working on The Unit Guide – a six-volume box set which gives profiles of all 5,700 units that made up the Australian Army in the Second World War.

The trove summary for the set states that:

725,000 Australian men and women joined the Australian Army in World War Two and served in one or more of the 5,700 separate units which were formed in the AIF and AMF... (there were) 5,500 units in the Australian Army during the war (which between them had over 13,700 unit names)...Only 409 (7%) of the units have any published unit history.

Each unit profile covers what is known of the unit's formation, role, organisation, movements, operations and place in the army's hierarchy, including references to the unit's war diary at the Australian War Memorial. The series was published in 2018, and led to the Chief of Army awarding Graham a Gold Level Commendation presented at the Army Museum of Western Australia in Fremantle in November 2018.
In the 2020 Australia Day Honours McKenzie-Smith was appointed a Member of the Order of Australia for "significant service to military history preservation, and to forestry".

Western Australia
McKenzie-Smith's recent works include a book about the coastal defences of Albany, Bunbury, and Fremantle in the Second World War, and the Royal Australian Engineers in Western Australia.

Forester
In the 1980s and 1990s McKenzie-Smith was a forester in Western Australia. When resident in Canberra in the mid-1990s, he was CEO of ACT Forests. He was also a member of the ACT Bush Fire Council in 1998–2000.

McKenzie-Smith is currently resident in Perth, Western Australia.

Sabretache articles

References 

Australian military historians
Historians of Australia
Living people
Year of birth missing (living people)
Members of the Order of Australia